The Oil Industry Safety Directorate (OISD) is a technical advisory body in India. It was established in 1986 by Ministry of Petroleum and Natural Gas. The OISD formulates and implements safety standards for the oil industry.

Overview
The main responsibilities OISD are:
 Standardization;
 Accident analysis;
 Evaluation of safety performance.

OISD has framed rules and guidelines for safe distances to be observed for various facilities in an oil installation. All the new liquefied petroleum gas (LPG) bottling plants in India are designed based on the guidelines of OISD. OISD has also issued guidelines for the safe operations of petrol stations and standards related to petroleum installations.

See also

 Energy law
 Petroleum And Explosives Safety Organisation
 Petrol stations in India

References

External links
 {{[URL = http://www.oisd.gov.in]}}

Petroleum industry in India
Government agencies for energy (India)
Ministry of Petroleum and Natural Gas